Richboro is a census-designated place (CDP) in Northampton Township, Bucks County, Pennsylvania, United States. The population was 6,378 during the 2020 census.

History
Hampton Hill, John Thompson House, Twin Trees Farm, and Willow Mill Complex are listed on the National Register of Historic Places.

Geography
Richboro is located at  (40.221658, -75.006047). Tyler State Park is partially located in Richboro.

Demographics

At the 2000 census there were 6,678 people, 2,062 households, and 1,864 families living in the CDP. The population density was 1,524.5 people per square mile (588.7/km). There were 2,072 housing units at an average density of 473.0/sq mi (182.6/km).  The racial makeup of the CDP was 97.09% White, 0.36% African American, 1.81% Asian, 0.01% from other races, and 0.72% from two or more races. Hispanic or Latino of any race were 0.63%.

There were 2,062 households, 45.4% had children under the age of 18 living with them, 83.9% were married couples living together, 4.7% had a female householder with no husband present, and 9.6% were non-families. 8.1% of households were made up of individuals, and 4.4% were one person aged 65 or older. The average household size was 3.20 and the average family size was 3.39.

The age distribution was 28.9% under the age of 18, 6.5% from 18 to 24, 25.2% from 25 to 44, 29.7% from 45 to 64, and 9.7% 65 or older. The median age was 40 years. For every 100 females, there were 96.2 males. For every 100 females age 18 and over, there were 92.7 males.

The median household income was $91,204 and the median family income  was $94,316. Males had a median income of $67,222 versus $36,351 for females. The per capita income for the CDP was $31,954. About 1.5% of families and 1.8% of the population were below the poverty line, including 1.6% of those under age 18 and 4.4% of those age 65 or over.

Richboro is in the township of Northampton along with Holland and Churchville. A majority of students attend Council Rock School District.

References

Census-designated places in Bucks County, Pennsylvania
Census-designated places in Pennsylvania